Kidd v. Pearson, 128 U.S. 1 (1888), was a case in which the Supreme Court of the United States held that a distinction between manufacturing and commerce meant that an Iowa law that prohibited the manufacture of alcohol (in this case for sale out-of-state) was constitutional as it did not conflict with the power of the US Congress to regulate interstate commerce.

Background
In 1882, Iowa became a dry state with a passage of a state constitutional amendment. An Iowa state law supporting that prohibition made the manufacturing of liquor in Iowa illegal unless it was for mechanical, medicinal, culinary, and sacramental purposes.  Nonetheless, the Polk County Board of Supervisors granted J. S. Kidd a license to operate a distillery in 1884 for other uses based on his intent to only sell the liquor outside the state of Iowa. When the state moved to close the distillery as a public nuisance, Kidd sued and argued it was outside of state jurisdiction as an exclusively interstate business under the commerce clause.

Question before the Supreme Court
Is there a conflict between the power of Congress to regulate interstate commerce.

Decision of the Court
The court ruled that there was not a conflict between Congress' power to regulate interstate commerce and the state law covering manufacturing within a given state. Therefore, the law was valid.

See also
List of United States Supreme Court cases, volume 128
Varnum v. Brien, 763 N.W.2d 862 (Iowa 2009), another U.S. Supreme Court case from Polk County

References

Further reading

External links
 
 

1888 in United States case law
United States Constitution Article One case law
United States Supreme Court cases
United States Supreme Court cases of the Fuller Court
United States Commerce Clause case law
Prohibition in the United States
Legal history of Iowa
Polk County, Iowa